Cisthene bisigna is a moth of the family Erebidae. It was described by Carlos Berg in 1875 and is found in Patagonia.

References

Cisthenina
Moths described in 1875